Hilarographa ancilla is a species of moth of the family Tortricidae. It is found in India (Bombay).

The wingspan is about 19 mm. The ground colour of the forewings is yellow orange. The specular field is darker with two dark brown spots. There is a trace of orange dots arranged in curved lines in the posterior and median parts of the wing and at the base. The hindwings are dark brown with an orange cream median cell.

Etymology
The specific name is derived from Latin ancilla (meaning a servant).

References

Moths described in 2009
Hilarographini